Daniel Elena (born 26 October 1972) also known as "Danos" is a Monégasque rally co-driver working most notably with Sébastien Loeb. Between them the pair have won the World Rally Championship (WRC) nine times with Citroën, later competing with Hyundai. Their 79 wins together make him the co-driver with the most victories in the history of the WRC.

Career
He started rallying in 1992 as co-driver to Christophe Bovini but his first 'full season' came in 1996 with Hervé Bernard in the French national championships. In 1998 he became Loeb's co-driver and quickly developed a strong relationship with him, winning every event they finished in the Citroën Saxo Trophy in 1998, then the overall trophy itself in 1999. The following year with Citroën part-backing the duo, they won the two-wheel drive class of the French gravel title. 

In 2001, they won both the FIA Super 1600 championship (later J-WRC) in their Citroën Saxo and the French national championship in a Citroën Xsara Kit Car. Becoming an obvious choice for Citroën's WRC team, they made their first start for the manufacturer in the same year, finishing 2nd overall on the 2001 San Remo Rally. A part programme in 2002 included their first win at Rallye Deutschland and in 2003 they became full-time competitors. As team mates to former drivers champions Colin McRae and Carlos Sainz, Loeb and Elena outscored them both finishing the season second overall. They went on to take nine consecutive World Rally Championship titles between 2004 and 2012, before Loeb retired from the series in 2013.

When Loeb came out of WRC retirement in 2018 the pair reunited for Citroën again, running three events and winning Rally Catalunya. Hyundai Motorsport offered Loeb a two year contract running a few events in 2019 and 2020, and Elena once again was his co-driver.

Between 2016 and 2019, Loeb entered the famous Dakar Rally with Elena by his side behind the wheel of a modified Peugeot 3008, reaching the podium twice. In 2021 the pair entered in a Prodrive built car but had to retire. Two months later, Elena posted on social media that he had effectively been sacked by Loeb at Prodrive's request because of the poor Dakar result. Rally's most successful pairing of all time separated after 23 years of working together.

Elena has also entered a few rallies as a driver, including the Monte-Carlo Rally, though never outside France.

Loeb and Elena have won Elena's home rally, the famous Monte Carlo Rally seven times (2003–2005, 2007–2008, 2012–2013).

Elena is the first person to have received the Michael Park Trophy, which is now given yearly to the best co-driver.

Personal life 

Elena is divorced and has 2 daughters, Romane and Dorine, with his former wife. He and his new partner, Anaïs Reyne, welcomed a daughter, Joy, on 9 October 2020.

Commitment
Elena is today a member of the ‘Champions for Peace’ club, a group of 54 famous elite athletes committed to serving peace in the world through sport, created by Peace and Sport, a Monaco-based international organization.

Complete WRC results

WRC results

As driver

As co-driver

* Season still in progress.

JWRC results

Notes

References

1972 births
Living people
Monegasque rally co-drivers
Monegasque rally drivers
World Rally Championship co-drivers
Dakar Rally co-drivers
People from Monte Carlo